Pseudoligostigma incisa is a moth in the family Crambidae. It was described by Strand in 1920. It is found in Trinidad.

References

Glaphyriinae
Moths described in 1920